Chrissy Chlapecka (born April 11, 2000) is an American TikTok personality, activist, and musician. She is best known as a key figure in "#BimboTok", a TikTok subculture centered on reclaiming the bimbo stereotype and aesthetic in a queer, feminist, and leftist context.

In advance of her debut single "I'm So Hot", Rolling Stone named Chlapeka one of "The Brightest Pop Stars to Watch in 2023", writing "With notes of Paris Hilton’s short-lived pop stardom and Britney Spears’ Blackout, Chlapekca has the charisma to become the new reigning star of this year’s dance floors."

Biography 
Originally from St. Charles, Illinois, Chlapecka grew up performing musical theatre and initially intended to pursue a career in it, but ultimately decided against it. She subsequently dropped out of college, and for a time worked three jobs to afford rent. Around 2021, Chlapeka began earning enough money through social media content creation to leave her job as a Starbucks barista.

TikTok 
Chlapecka created her TikTok account in 2019 and began posting videos during the COVID-19 pandemic out of boredom. She first went viral with a reenactment of an uncomfortable encounter with a stranger at Walgreens, which quickly received over 500,000 likes. She gained prominence on the app through late 2022, with upbeat bimbo-themed content geared towards female and queer audiences ("girls, gays, and theys") and adamantly critical of capitalism and Donald Trump. As of June 2022, she had over 4 million followers on the platform.

Music 
Chlapecka was featured on singer Boy Hazy's 2021 album Divinium Armor, including the single "Love In The Wind". She began teasing her own music in late 2022, and a preview of her single "I'm So Hot" went viral on TikTok. In advance of the song's release, Rolling Stone named Chlapeka one of "The Brightest Pop Stars to Watch in 2023", writing that she had "the charisma to become the new reigning star of this year’s dance floors." The song, recorded in Los Angeles with co-writer Alex Veltri and producer Dallas Caton, was released on February 3, 2023. She also teased a second single, an EP and an eventual tour.

Other 
Chlapecka has a presence on Cameo, where she sells commissioned personalized videos. From April until June 2021, Chlapecka and Craig MacNeil co-hosted the podcast Chrissy & Craig. Chlapecka had previously appeared on MacNeil's main podcast, Craig & Friends. Other podcasts she has appeared on include We're Having Gay Sex, Don't Let This Flop, and The Comment Section with Drew Afualo. Chlapecka has hosted several live comedy shows at Zanies Comedy Club in Chicago. In 2022, she appeared at Los Angeles Pride alongside Dylan Mulvaney and other TikTok creators and at VidCon, where she participated in a panel entitled "Hot Gurlz Only" with fellow TikTokers Sarah Schauer and Drew Afualo.

Recognition 
Drag performer Bimini Bon-Boulash praised Chlapecka in their 2021 autobiography Release the Beast: A Drag Queen's Guide to Life, calling her "part of a new wave of women subverting [the] male gaze by playing up to the bimbo stereotype on camera while asserting their own feminist politics".

Artistry

Style, persona, and "Bimboism" 
Chlapecka's online persona and content center on reclaiming the traditionally sexist "bimbo" archetype. She has been credited, along with friend and fellow TikToker Griffin Maxwell Brooks, as one of the founders of #BimboTok, a community of similarly-minded creators. She adopts an intentionally hyperfeminine aesthetic in her videos, including alternately platinum blonde or dyed pink hair, sometimes in pigtails; bold makeup and bright pink outfits that feature miniskirts, platform boots, and faux fur-trimmed coats and bralettes; and a breathy falsetto speaking voice often compared to pop star Ariana Grande. Her persona has been described by media outlets as a "doe-eyed, blonde-haired, pink-latex-clad, she/they viral superstar" and "if Lady Gaga were your favorite barista dishing out advice and zingers," and by Chlapecka herself as "an encouraging big sister type".

Chlapecka's content is often satirical, utilizing sarcasm and irony to deliver sociopolitical commentary and messages of self-love and authenticity. Several videos comedically depict the perceived stupidity of the stereotypical bimbo (such as an inability to spell or do math) while reframing it as a deliberate response to social and economic inequality, with lines such as “A modern-day bimbo doesn't need to know 'what a mortgage is' or 'how to file taxes,' but we do know it's time to let go those who are in prison for marijuana charges when the states that they're in have decriminalised marijuana" and "I don’t know what the economy is, I don’t know what supply and demand is. All I know is that our problems would be solved if we’d just print more money." Videos are also critical of capitalism, Donald Trump, Elon Musk, police brutality, the pro-life movement, and male chauvinists, while voicing support for sex workers, birth control, the LGBT community, sexual liberation, and the Black Lives Matter movement. Her content also includes relationship advice and humorous anecdotes such as getting her “clit pierced at Claire’s” and buying bisexual stuffed animals from Build-A-Bear. She often ends videos with the sung catchphrase "Oh me oh my", an homage to the Slayyyter song "Mine".

Chlapecka did not initially self-identify as a "bimbo", but adopted the label when TikTok commenters began using it for her in an affirming manner. In interviews, she has presented her "bimboism" as a reclaiming of femininity and sexual autonomy, as well as a rejection of social standards in favor of embracing outsiders. Her outlook was influenced by celebrities like Paris Hilton, as well as an upbringing in which she herself was often dismissed as an unintelligent "bimbo". She has summarized the philosophy as "Bimboism means liberating yourself, your body, and your aesthetic to be what you want them to be without the judgment of others."

Musical style 

Chlapecka cites hyperpop and 2000s pop music artists like Britney Spears, Paris Hilton, Slayyyter, Rebecca Black, Lady Gaga, Ariana Grande, and Charli XCX as musical influences. Speaking to Inked magazine, she said that her "brand as a musician is very similar to the brand I have on TikTok” and that her upcoming music would be "the storybook of my life....I want my music to reflect back and pay tribute to the girl I was in high school, because she really needed a big hug." She has expressed a desire to bridge the gap between hyperpop and traditional pop music. Rolling Stone described her single "I'm So Hot" as having "notes of Paris Hilton’s short-lived pop stardom and Britney Spears’ Blackout". She has also been compared to Prince, Kylie Minogue, Nadia Oh, and Kesha.

Personal life 
Chlapecka lives in Chicago and owns a miniature dachshund named Sugar Sparkles, which she bought in 2021.

She is bisexual and uses she/her and they/them pronouns. Many of her videos center around her LGBTQ identity, with Chlapecka saying "“I love when people are like, ‘Stop making being gay your whole identity.' [...] That’s where so much of like, my confidence in myself has come from." She has also said that she was rejected by her family due to "being bi and being myself and wearing what i wear", but found acceptance in Chicago's LGBTQ community.

Prior to TikTok fame, Chlapecka struggled with insecurity and was in an abusive relationship, which she ended in 2020 during the pandemic. She has several tattoos, including six butterflies and the phrase "Divine Feminine" on her ribs; the latter, her first tattoo, represents her embrace of femininity and rejection of patriarchy, and was done while she was still in the relationship.

Chlapecka identifies as a feminist but has argued for much of the movement needing to be "reworked", citing issues such as the historic whiteness in many strains, heteronormativity, and the persistence of anti-trans voices. She has also criticized what she perceives as the gatekeeping of activism by those in higher education, arguing that shared communal knowledge and lived experience are "just as credible as reading something from a fucking book. Go ahead, be a smart person and use that to be an activist – but don’t tell me my opinion doesn’t count because I don’t talk a certain way, or know certain things. That’s about access to education, and it’s classist."

Chlapecka has ADHD and anxiety, and has said that, contrary to her online persona, she is "extremely introverted" in real life.

Notes

References

External links 

American TikTokers
American feminists
People from St. Charles, Illinois
American pop singers
Bisexual comedians
Social media influencers
American left-wing activists
LGBT people from Illinois
American LGBT comedians
2000 births

Living people